John Richard Gayle (30 November 1923 – 15 September 2020) was a West Indian cricket umpire. He stood in three Test matches between 1972 and 1986 and two ODI games between 1984 and 1988. Gayle died on 15 September 2020, aged 96.

See also
 List of Test cricket umpires
 List of One Day International cricket umpires

References

1923 births
2020 deaths
People from Saint Elizabeth Parish
Jamaican cricket umpires
West Indian Test cricket umpires
West Indian One Day International cricket umpires